Neil McCarthy (May 18, 1939 – September 18, 2021) was an American college basketball coach. He was head coach of the Weber State Wildcats team from 1974 to 1985 and at the New Mexico State Aggies from 1985 to 1997.

At Weber State, McCarthy led the Wildcats to four NCAA tournaments, including the school's first NCAA Tournament win since reaching the Sweet 16 in 1972.  He remained Weber State's winningest coach until Randy Rahe broke his wins record in 2016.

During most of McCarthy's tenure at New Mexico State, the Aggies were the second-best team in what became the Big West Conference, behind UNLV.  After UNLV hit the skids, McCarthy took advantage and led the Aggies to four straight Big West tournament titles and four straight NCAA Tournaments from 1990 to 1994.  His best team was the 1991–92 unit, which advanced all the way to the Sweet 16—the Aggies' deepest run in the tournament since the 1970 Final Four unit.

McCarthy was abruptly fired just weeks before the start of practice for the 1997–98 season.  Athletic director Jim Paul cited a number of factors, principally the basketball team's poor performance in the classroom.  McCarthy only graduated nine players in his 12 years at the school (an 11 percent graduation rate), including only one in his last four years.  In Paul's view, this meant that McCarthy emphasized winning over academics.  He left New Mexico State as the school's winningest coach, but has since been passed by Lou Henson.

Officially, McCarthy was reassigned as an assistant athletic director for the balance of his contract.  However, he resigned rather than assume that post.

Academic scandals
Despite McCarthy's success in building two regional powers, two major academic scandals forced his departure from the coaching profession.

In early 1995, it emerged that six players had received help from one of McCarthy's assistants on their work at correspondence courses, including answers on their exams.  After this came to light, New Mexico State withdrew from postseason consideration for the 1995-96 season.  In July 1996, the NCAA placed New Mexico State on three years' probation and stripped the Aggies of their NCAA tournament appearances in 1992, 1993 and 1994.  Although McCarthy was not involved in the violations, the NCAA severely criticized him for not properly controlling the program.  It slapped him with a two-year "show-cause" order, meaning that if he ever left New Mexico State, any penalties imposed on him would have followed him to his new employer unless that school demonstrated that he had served his punishment.

After his ouster, McCarthy sued New Mexico State for wrongful termination.  During a deposition related to that suit, McCarthy admitted under oath that he had entered into a verbal agreement to hire Fletcher Cockrell, then the head coach at Jones County Community College in Mississippi, as an assistant coach if two of his star players signed with New Mexico State.  Cockrell helped the players with their coursework and exams.

After the violations came to light, New Mexico State withdrew from postseason consideration for the 2000–01 season, and placed the basketball team on two years' probation.  The NCAA accepted New Mexico State's penalties, but imposed an additional four years' probation and forced the Aggies to vacate every game they played in 1996–97 and 1997–98.  It also slapped McCarthy with a five-year show-cause order.  Cockrell, who had been involved in violations at another school, received a 10-year show-cause order. The final report noted the similarities with the 1996 case.  It also strongly hinted that had the Aggies not taken swift corrective action, the penalties might have been even harsher, and possibly included the "death penalty".  However, it praised New Mexico State for forcing out McCarthy, the school president and Paul's predecessor as athletic director.

Death
McCarthy died at his home in Utah on September 18, 2021.

Head coaching record 

* New Mexico State was forced to vacate its 1992, 1993 and 1994 NCAA appearances due to academic fraud.  Official records for those seasons are 23–7, 25–7 and 23–7, respectively.

** Entire 1996–97 season, as well as share of Big West title, vacated due to academic fraud.
% Official record at New Mexico State is 226–111 (130–68 Big West) without vacated games.

References

1939 births
2021 deaths
American men's basketball coaches
American men's basketball players
Basketball coaches from California
College basketball controversies in the United States
College men's basketball head coaches in the United States
NCAA sanctions
New Mexico State Aggies men's basketball coaches
Sacramento State Hornets men's basketball players
Weber State Wildcats men's basketball coaches